The  is an organization set up in December 1951 to advance photography in Japan. Its membership of about 1,400 includes both amateur and professional photographers, as well as researchers, critics, and people in the photographic industry. Its address is in Ichibanchō, Chiyoda, Tokyo.

Since its inception, the Society has annually presented a large number of awards.

References

External links

Arts organizations established in 1951
Japanese photography organizations
1951 establishments in Japan